Craspedortha montana is a species of moth of the family Sphingidae. It is known from Yunnan in China and northern Thailand.

The length of the forewings is 23–24.5 mm for males and about 27 mm for females. It is similar to Craspedortha porphyria porphyria but distinguishable by the orange-red patches on the undersides of the wings and body. Females are similar to males but larger and broader winged.

In northern Thailand, adults have been recorded in February and July.

References

Smerinthini
Moths described in 2000